Murunducaris is a genus of crustacean in family Parastenocarididae. It contains the following species:
Murunducaris dactyloides (Kiefer, 1967)
Murunducaris juneae Reid, 1994
Murunducaris loyolai Corgosinho, Martínez Arbizu & Reid, 2008
Murunducaris noodti Corgosinho, Martínez Arbizu & Reid, 2008

References

Further reading

External links

Harpacticoida
Taxonomy articles created by Polbot